Guillaume de Sardes, is a writer, a photographer, an historian of art and a French curator. He was born on 14 April 1979. As a literary critic, he collaborates with magazines like Commentaire, Edwarda, and literary newspapers like .

Biography 
His first novel, Giovanni Pico, published in 2007, is devoted to the humanist Jean Pic de la Mirandole. He makes of him a Nietzschean figure and develops a really classic and light style. He obtained the Prix Ulysse for this work.
La Dernière passion de Son Éminence (2008), is an ironic and light novel. It was inspired by a real news story, on which the lawyer Jacques Vergès worked: a triple murder that took place in the Vatican in 1998. Action is however transposed in 1939. By its tone and its construction (using the process of entrenchment stories), La dernière passion de Son Éminence recalls  libertine novels of the eighteenth century. Son éminence en rose et blanc (2011) uses the same characters (including  Cardinal Benvenuto, cocaine addict and debauched old esthete). The plot is pure fantasy this time, although the context of the Vatican and fascist Italy is always really worked. Released in 2009, Le Nil est froid (Prix Bourgogne de littérature, Prix François-Mauriac de l'Académie française) explores  the themes of war, obsessions and of artistic creation. It has for backdrop, the Egyptian Campaign. Latest novel to date, Le Dédain explores the different ways of loving in contemporary Paris. Alongside his work as a novelist, Guillaume de Sardes  is one of the best specialists of Russian Ballets. He has written a biography of Vaslav Nijinsky , edited and translated the Memoirs of Serge Diaghilev.
His work as a photographer and a videographer, regularly exhibited in France and abroad, covers the themes of the intimate, wandering and night.

Artworks 
 Novels
 Giovanni Pico, Paris, Hermann, 2007  
 La Dernière passion de Son Éminence, Paris, Hermann, 2008
 Le Nil est froid, Paris, Hermann, 2009
 Son Éminence en rose-et-blanc, Paris, Grasset, 2011
 Le Dédain, Paris, Grasset, 2012 
 Essays 
 Nijinski, sa vie, son geste, sa pensée, Paris Hermann, 2006.

Editing and text translation 

 Memoirs of Serge Diaghilev  
 Photobooks 
 "New territories", with Nicolas Comment, Ola Rindal, Henry Roy, presentation by Dominique Baqué, Paris, 2014

Photography exhibits 
 Paris-Tokyo aller-retour (collective exhibit), 2015, Paris, Maison de la culture du Japon.
 "Vie secrètes", 2015, Tirana, TULLA culture center.
 Possession immédiate (collective exhibit), 2015, Paris, galerie 24B.
 MTAG goupshow (collective exhibit), 2014, Paris, More Than A Gallery.
 "Vies secrètes", 2014, Paris, Myriam Bouagal Gallery 
 New territories, 2014, Beyrouth, Gathering/Institut français.

External links 
 Notices d'autorité : Fichier d'autorité international virtuel • Bibliothèque nationale de France • Système universitaire de documentation

1979 births
Living people
French art historians
21st-century French writers